Jadwiga Barbara Ostrowska-Czubenko (born 18 January 1949 in Kołobrzeg) is a Polish chemist at the Nicolaus Copernicus University in Toruń.

Biography
Ostrowska-Czubenko attended the Nicolaus Copernicus University in Toruń, majoring in chemistry. She graduated in 1972, defended her doctoral thesis eight years later, and completed her habilitation in 2002. She is associate professor in the Department of Chemistry at the Nicolaus Copernicus University, where she specializes in physical Chemistry and physicochemistry of polymers.

Awards
 Award of the Ministry of Science and Higher Education (1985)
 Award of the Scientific Secretariat of the Polish Academy of Sciences (1980, 1989)
 Member of the Polish Chemical Society (1985)

External links

1949 births
Living people
21st-century chemists
21st-century Polish scientists
21st-century women scientists
Polish chemists
Polish women chemists
Physical chemists
People from Kołobrzeg